Troy Grosenick (born August 27, 1989) is an American ice hockey professional goaltender currently playing for the Lehigh Valley Phantoms of the American Hockey League (AHL), while under contract to the Philadelphia Flyers of the National Hockey League (NHL).

Playing career
Grosenick was born and raised in the Milwaukee/Waukesha suburb of Brookfield, Wisconsin, where he attended Brookfield East High School and graduated in 2007. He then went on to play with Team Illinois' Midget Major team for a year, and eventually ended up playing for the Cedar Rapids RoughRiders for two years before heading off to play for Union College in New York.

Grosenick played for the Union Dutchmen in the NCAA Men's Division I ECAC Hockey conference. In his sophomore year (2011–2012), Grosenick's outstanding play was recognized when he won the Ken Dryden Award as the ECAC Goaltender of the Year, and was selected to the 2011–12 ECAC First Team All-League. He was also named a First-Team AHCA All-American and was a Hobey Baker Award Finalist.

On April 8, 2013, following his third year at Union, Grosenick signed a one-year entry-level contract with the San Jose Sharks.

On November 12, 2014, Grosenick was called up after goalie Alex Stalock was placed on injured reserve. He made his NHL debut on November 16, 2014 against the Carolina Hurricanes where he went on to record a 45-save 2–0 shutout, becoming the 22nd goalie to record a shutout in their debut, and at the same time setting a record for most saves in a shutout debut in the modern era.

Grosenick was recalled once more on January 3, 2016 when Alex Stalock was sent down to the Sharks' AHL affiliate, the San Jose Barracuda, on a conditioning assignment.

He was re-signed by San Jose on June 5, 2017.

On February 25, 2018, Grosenick along with Brandon Bollig were traded to the Nashville Predators in exchange for a sixth round draft pick in 2018.

Grosenick started the 2018–19 season with the Milwaukee Admirals before being recalled by the Predators on October 22. He was reassigned to Milwaukee on October 31. On March 1, 2019, after posting a 14–12–3 record, Grosenick signed a one-year, two-way contract with the Predators.

On October 9, 2020, Grosenick was signed as a free agent to a one-year, two-way contract with the Los Angeles Kings. After attending the Kings training camp, Grosenick initially made the Kings roster, serving as the backup in their opening 2020–21 season game before he was placed on waivers. He was subsequently claimed the following day by the Edmonton Oilers on January 16, 2021. Added by the Oilers as insurance with an injury to veteran Mike Smith, Grosenick remained on the Oilers roster without making an appearances until he was subsequently re-claimed by the Kings off waivers on February 6, 2021. He was immediately assigned to AHL affiliate, the Ontario Reign. On March 10, 2021,  Grosenick was called back up to the Kings to make his first NHL start since the 2014–15 season, against the Anaheim Ducks. He made 33 saves for the Kings and earned his second career victory in a 5–1 victory.

As a free agent following his lone season with the Kings, Grosenick was signed to a one-year, two-way contract with the Boston Bruins on July 28, 2021.

After a standout season within the Bruins organization, Grosenick left as a free agent and was signed to a one-year, $750,000 contract with the Philadelphia Flyers on July 13, 2022.

Career statistics

Awards and honors

References

External links
 

1989 births
Living people
AHCA Division I men's ice hockey All-Americans
American men's ice hockey goaltenders
Cedar Rapids RoughRiders players
Ice hockey players from Wisconsin
Lehigh Valley Phantoms players
Los Angeles Kings players
Milwaukee Admirals players
Ontario Reign (AHL) players
People from Brookfield, Wisconsin
Providence Bruins players
San Jose Barracuda players
San Jose Sharks players
Sportspeople from the Milwaukee metropolitan area
Undrafted National Hockey League players
Union Dutchmen ice hockey players
Worcester Sharks players